This page lists the armoury (emblazons=graphics and blazons=heraldic descriptions; or coats of arms) of the communes in la Manche. (Department 50)

Communes without arms 
The following communes don't have official arms, according to the information received from the city halls by La Banque du Blason, who were kind enough to provide the list:

Amfreville, Aumeville-Lestre, Boutteville, Brucheville, Carquebut, Colomby, Couville, Crosville-sur-Douve, Fierville-les-Mines, Flottemanville-Bocage, Gatteville-le-Phare, Gonneville, Gourbesville, Gréville-Hague, Helleville, Hemevez, Huberville, Jobourg, Martinvast, Le Mesnil, Négreville, Neuville-au-Plain, Omonville-la-Rogue, Quinéville, Rauville-la-Bigot, Rauville-la-Place, Ravenoville, Le Rozel, Saint-Germain-de-Varreville, Saint-Germain-des-Vaux, Saint-Jacques-de-Néhou, Saint-Martin-d'Audouville, Surville, Tocqueville, Valcanville, Vasteville, Vauville, Yvetot-Bocage. (non exhaustive list)

A

B

C

D

E

F

G

H

J

L

M

N

O

P

Q

R

S

T

U

V

References

External links 

 La banque du blason :  – Heraldic site (in French) for the various divisions of France, current and historical.
 GeoTree :  - administrative divisions by country

History of Manche
Manche